Kenny Foray (born 2 August 1984) is a French motorcycle racer.

Career

In 2007, Foray became champion of the French Supersport class with Triumph.

In 2009, Foray became champion of the Polish Supersport class.

In 2014, Foray won the World Endurance Championship with the Yamaha GMT94 team.

In 2017, Foray won both the French Superbike championship as well as repeating his feat of winning the World Endurance Championship.

In 2019, Foray entered the inaugural MotoE World Cup with Tech3. He finished in last place with 11 points.

Personal life
Kenny has a twin brother Freddy Foray who is also a motorcycle racer in endurance racing

References 

Living people
1984 births
MotoE World Cup riders